Eunidia guttulata is a species of beetle in the family Cerambycidae. It was described by Charles Coquerel in 1851, originally under the genus Sphenura.

References

Eunidiini
Beetles described in 1851
Taxa named by Charles Coquerel